Barwich is a surname. Notable people with the surname include:

 Ann-Sophie Barwich, cognitive scientist, empirical philosopher and historian of science
 Heinz Barwich (1911–1966), German nuclear physicist

See also
 Barwick (surname)